Padres e Hijos (English: "Parents and Children") was a long-running Colombian daytime series produced by Colombiana de Televisión.

On August 21, 2009 the last Padres e Hijos episode of the series aired, due to the cancellation of its contract with Caracol TV.
Ana María Abello starred as Fabiana. 
The program is mostly remembered for its longevity on Colombian television and its alleged dubious quality.

Relatives
Lina Tajeiro

References

External links 
 Official site Off-Line

1993 Colombian television series debuts
2009 Colombian television series endings
1990s Colombian television series
2000s Colombian television series